P&M Aviation was a British aircraft manufacturer, specializing in ultralight trikes, founded in 2003. The company was purchased by Albatross Flying Systems in 2019.

History 
The company was formed in 2003 by Keith Duckworth's purchase of two rival British trike manufacturers, Pegasus Aviation and Mainair Sports, hence the name of the new company.

P&M retained both the Mainair factory at Rochdale and the Pegasus plant at Manton near Marlborough, Wiltshire, the former carrying out production and the latter research and development. The Rochdale factory was closed in March 2016.

On 7 May 2019 the company was put into administration, with T A Close of Milsted Langdon LLP appointed as its Administrator. Subsequently, its assets were bought by Albatross Flying Systems of Bangalore, India.

Solar Wings

Solar Wings was the hang glider division of Pegasus Aviation prior to its merger with Mainair. After the merger, Solar Wings gliders were produced in the new combined production facility for a short time. The division produced a wide range of hang gliders from 1980 until it was wound up some time after 2002. Gliders produced include the Solar Wings Breeze and the Solar Wings Scandal series.

Aircraft 

P&M also imported and sold the John Pendry-Evans designed Ace Magic from India.

References

External links

Aircraft manufacturers of the United Kingdom
Companies based in Wiltshire
Ultralight trikes
Companies that have entered administration in the United Kingdom
British companies established in 2003
British companies disestablished in 2019